"Eminado" (meaning "Good Luck Charm") is a song by Nigerian singer Tiwa Savage. It features vocals from Don Jazzy and was released as the seventh single from her debut studio album Once Upon a Time (2013). The song peaked at number 2 on MTV Base's Official Naija Top 10 chart from March 7 through March 13, 2014. Vanguard newspaper ranked it 10th on its list of the top ten hit songs that made 2013. "Eminando" received generally positive reviews from music critics and consumers. On the contrary, the music video was criticized for bearing close resemblance to Tumi and the Volume's "Asinamali" video.

Background and controversy
"Eminado" was recorded in 2013 and translates to "Good Luck Charm". In an interview with Vanguard newspaper, Savage said Don Jazzy created the sound and name of the song. She also said rehearsing in the studio resulted in the formulation of the song's concept. After the song was serviced to radio stations, Savage kept her fans (who had to wait nearly two months for the video) in suspense. The accompanying music video for "Eminado" was shot and directed by Clarence Peters. It was uploaded to YouTube on November 4, 2013. Jim Donnett complimented the video's fashion styling, coordination and color theme.

In January 2014, a copyright infringement was leveled against Clarence Peters following the video's release. He allegedly stole the vintage nature of the "Asinamali" video, which was released by Tumi and the Volume to honor the artistic works of Seydou Keïta. Tumi slandered Peters on Twitter and urged his fans to shine a light on the issue. Savage's then-manager and husband Tunji "Tee Billz" Balogun said he and his wife never knew the video's concept was adopted from another video and were surprised as everyone else.

Live performances
Savage performed "Eminado" at a farewell concert for Nelson Mandela in January 2014. She also performed "Eminado" during the 2014 Star Music Trek tour, which commenced on March 29 and ended on May 31, 2014. On March 7, 2014, Savage graced the Golden Tullip, FESTAC music festival stage. On June 28, 2014, she performed "Eminado" alongside Sarkodie and Mafikizolo at BET's "Music Around the Globe" presentation. Savage performed the song at the 2014 edition of Africa Unplugged, alongside Davido and Diamond Platnumz. Moreover, she performed "Eminado" at Nigeria's Independent Day show in Warri, alongside Ja Rule, Ashanti, Davido, Flavour N'abania, Oritsefemi, Yemi Alade, Patoranking, Olamide, Wizkid, Iyanya, Dr SID, Harrysong, Ice Prince, Daddy Showkey and Seyi Shay.

Accolades
"Eminado" was nominated in the World's Best Song and World's Best Video categories at the 2014 World Music Awards. At the 2014 Nigeria Entertainment Awards, the song was nominated for Hottest Single of the Year. The music video for "Eminado" won Most Gifted Female Video and was nominated for Most Gifted Video of the Year at the 2014 Channel O Music Video Awards.

Covers and remixes
"Eminado" (Mystro cover) - 3:42
"Eminado" (Champeta Remix by DJ Yoko) -3:56

References

External links

2013 songs
2013 singles
Tiwa Savage songs
Don Jazzy songs
Song recordings produced by Don Jazzy
Songs written by Tiwa Savage
Mavin Records singles